Axiotis or Axioti/Axiotou (female equivalent) is a surname, and may refer to;

Axiotis derives from ἄξιος (axios) which means worthy in Greek with the suffix -της. (cf. ἄξιος) It could also come from Ἀξιός (cf. Axius) the river god and the ancient name for the Orontes and Vardar rivers. Axios is Thracian for 'not-shining' related to axšaēna the Avestan word for 'dark-coloured'.

 Alexandros Axiotis, Greek politician who took part in the Greek War of Independence
 Alexandros Axiotis (born 1996), Zambian swimmer
 Dimitrios Axiotis, Greek Paralympian athlete
 Angelos Axiotis, Greek songwriter 
 Georgios Axiotis (1875-1924), Greek composer, pianist and music critic
 Diamantis Axiotis (born 1942), Greek poet and prose writer
 Kyriakos Axiotis (born 1993), Greek medalist in Balkan and International Olympiad in Informatics
 Kyrillos Axiotis (1908-1991), Greek hierarch, metropolitan of Chaldia, Cheroian and Kerasounta
 Panayiotis Axiotis (1840-1918), Greek writer
 Stratis Axiotis (1907-1994), Greek hagiographer
 Melpo Axioti (1905-1973), Greek writer

See also
Akchoté

References

External links
Distribution of the surname Axiotis in USA

Greek-language surnames
Surnames